LGV may refer to:

Transportation and vehicles
 Large goods vehicle, Europe
 Laser Guided Vehicle
 Light goods vehicle, Hong Kong
 Lignes à Grande Vitesse, French high-speed rail lines:
 LGV Atlantique
 LGV Est
 LGV Interconnexion Est
 LGV Nord
 LGV Méditerranée
 LGV Picardie
 LGV Rhône-Alpes
 LGV Rhin-Rhône
 LGV Sud-Est
 LGV Sud Europe Atlantique

Other
 Lymphogranuloma venereum, a sexually transmitted disease
 Državljanska lista Gregorja Viranta (LGV) (Gregor Virant's Civic List), former name of Civic List (Slovenia), a political party in Slovenia
 Lattitude Global Volunteering, a British charity — volunteering for young people
 LG V series Android smartphones

See also

 LVG (disambiguation)
 LG5 (disambiguation)